Alexander Kondrashov may refer to:

 Aleksandr Kondrashov (born 1984), Russian football player
 Alexander Kondrashov (blogger) (born 1983), travel blogger